Mikhail Yuryevich Tyrin (born October 23, 1970, in Meshchovsk, Kaluga Oblast) is a  Russian science fiction writer.

Biography 
Year studied at Bauman Moscow State Technical University, and then graduated from the philological faculty of Kaluga State University.

He worked as a journalist, served in the field of internal affairs for a few years, as an employee of the press center of Kaluga Department of Internal Affairs, a member of the press center of the federal command in Chechnya (1995). He retired with the rank of captain of the militia.

His first story in 1996, Small Opportunities. In the same year published the first book of  The Shadow of the Patron Saint, awarded the Festival Aelita Prize (Start Award).

Personal life
Married, two children.

Bibliography

Novels 
 Phantom Pain (1998)
 Children Rust (1999)
 The Invincible Creature (2001)
 Syndicate Thunder (2002)
 Yellow Line (2003)
 The Reflected Threat (2005)
 Smuggler (2008)
 Cemetery of Gods (2009)
 Legions of Chaos (2011)
 Samovolka (together with Sergei Lukyanenko) (2014)

Story 
 Sins of the Night Sky (1996)
 End the Mystery of the Fall (1996)
 Graven Image (1998)
 Conspiracy of the Doomed (2001)
 Release the Beast (2001)
 Pustozemskie Kamni (2001)
 Doctor (2011)
 There is a Little Hurt (2014)

Stories 
 Small Features (1996)
 Revenge of the Minotaur (1999)
 What Will be Left to Us? (2001)
 Bitch (2002)
 Pushbutton Soldiers (2005)
 Shortest Path (2005)
 The Wheel of Fate (2009)
 There Overseas —  Africa  (2011)
 Chamber of Secrets (2011)
 Production Story (2012)
 Trouble the Water (2013)
 The Heart of the Enemy (2013)
 Vacation Courage (2014)

References

External links
 Михаил Тырин — «Лаборатория Фантастики»
Mikhail  Tyrin at the LiveJournal
 Автор: Михаил Тырин

1970 births
People from Meshchovsk
People from Meshchovsky District
Living people
Russian male novelists
Russian fantasy writers
Russian science fiction writers
Cyberpunk writers
Russian bloggers
Russian journalists
Russian nationalists
Male bloggers
Kaluga State University alumni
Anti-Ukrainian sentiment in Russia